GK Tauri is a young T Tauri-type pre-main sequence star in the constellation of Taurus about  away, belonging to the Taurus Molecular Cloud.

System 
The stars GK Tauri and GI Tauri form a wide binary system, with the projected separation between components being 1700 AU. The secondary component's orbit is not very eccentric, with a periastron of at least 890 AU.

GK Tauri was originally believed to have a close stellar companion WDS J04336+2421Ab. However, it was found to be an unrelated background star according to Gaia data.

Properties 
Both members of the binary system are medium-mass objects still contracting towards the main sequence and accreting mass, with the primary GK Tauri being close to entering the main sequence.

Protoplanetary system
Both stars are surrounded by compact protoplanetary disks, although the reason for the small disk sizes is not clear. GK Tauri's spectrum indicates a possible gap in the protoplanetary disk and a planet orbiting within the gap, with a semimajor axis of 2.4 AU.

References 

Binary stars
T Tauri stars
Circumstellar disks
Taurus (constellation)
J04333456+2421058
Tauri, HK
Hypothetical planetary systems